How McDougall Topped the Score is a 1924 Australian silent film directed by Victor Upton-Brown. It is based on a famous poem by Thomas Edward Spencer about a cricket match won when a dog steals a ball, enabling the batting team to score plenty of runs.

It is considered a lost film.

Plot
A cricket match takes place in the country between the towns of Piper's Flat and Molonglo. They placed a bet for the other team to pay for the lunch after the game. When Pipers Flat needs one more player, they ask Old McDougal if he could help them out. When the game started Molongo started a winning streak and pipers flat gave up hope they'll win.
But when McDougal came on to the pitch and hit the ball his dog Pincher comes out on the field enabling Dougal
To score 50 runs in the game to win

Cast
Leslie Gordon as McDougall
Ida Gresham as Mrs McDougall
Dorothy May as Mary McDougall
Wesley Barry as McDougall Jr
Frank Blandford as Johnstone
William Ralston as Brady
Joy Thompson
Pincher

Production
The film was shot in the Melbourne suburb of Ashburton and on location in the Dandenong Ranges. It was the first feature from Pacific Screen Plays, an Australian and New Zealand company.

Release
The film was previewed in October and made its debut in Adelaide on 10 November 1924 to coincide with the first match between the South Australian cricket team and a visiting English side. However it does not appear to have had a wide release.

References

External links

How McDougall Topped the Score at National Film and Sound Archive
Full text of original poem

1924 films
Australian drama films
Australian silent feature films
Australian black-and-white films
Cricket films
Lost Australian films
1924 drama films
1924 lost films
Lost drama films
Silent drama films